Al-Sham'ah Mosque or Bab ad-Darum Mosque is a historic mosque located in Hayy al-Najjarin (the Carpenters' Neighborhood) of the al-Zaytun Quarter in Gaza's Old City. Its name Sham'ah translates as "Candle," although the origin of the name is unknown. The mosque does not have a minaret. It was built on 8 March 1315 by the Mamluk Governor of Gaza, Sanjar al-Jawli.

The inscription on the mosque which states its endowment by al-Jawli and the reigning Mamluk sultan at the time, al-Nasir Muhammad, originally belonged to a mosque al-Jawli built previously. That mosque was destroyed in 1799, during Napoleon's invasion of Gaza. Its stones were then used for other edifices in Gaza while its inscription was attached to the al-Sham'ah Mosque. Since its construction in the 14th-century, al-Sham'ah Mosque has gone through numerous repairs and restorations.

In 1355 it was visited by Ibn Batutah who made the following note: "Gaza had a beautiful Friday mosque (Great Mosque of Gaza), but these days Friday service is conducted in the mosque built by the amir al-Jawli. It is an elegant building, strongly constructed and its pulpit is from white marble." 15th-century Islamic scholar al-Sakhawi mentions that Khatib Yusuf al-Ghazzi was the imam of the mosque in 1440–41.

References

Further reading

Buildings and structures completed in 1315
12th-century mosques
Bahri dynasty
Mamluk architecture in the State of Palestine
Mosques in Gaza City